Hokaglish (or Philippine Hybrid Hokkien), also known by locals as Sa-lam-tsam oe (mixed language, Tai-lo: sann-lām-tsham-uē), is an oral contact language primarily resulting among three languages: (1) Philippine Hokkien Chinese, (2) Tagalog/Filipino and (3) Philippine English. (Other languages that have relative influence include Philippine Spanish, Cantonese, and other local peripheral languages.)

Usage
Typically used amongst some Filipino Chinese or Chinese Filipinos, Hokaglish is used in various corporations, academic institutions, restaurants, and religious institutions. Some note that this is a result of having to maintain command of all three languages in the spheres of home, school and greater Philippine society. Although used by Chinese Filipinos in general, this form of code-switching or code-mixing is popular especially among the younger generations of Chinese Filipinos.

Etymology
The term Hokaglish is a portmanteau or blend of Hokkien and Taglish, itself a blend of Tagalog and English. It was first recorded in 2016.

Classification
Earlier thought to be a creole, it may actually be a mixed language similar to Light Warlpiri or Gurindji Kriol. It is also considered a hybrid English or X-English, making it one of the Philippine Englishes.

See also 
 Light Warlpiri in Australia
 Gurindji Kriol
 Media Lengua
 Bislish in the Philippines
 Bisalog in the Philippines
 Taglish in the Philippines
 Chavacano in the Philippines
 Singlish, similar phenomenon in Singapore

References 

Languages of the Philippines
Hokkien
Tagalog
English language
Philippine English
Mixed languages